The Hownsgill Viaduct (in some sources called Hownes Gill Viaduct and locally called the Gill bridge) is a former railway bridge located west of Consett in County Durham, England. It is currently used as a footpath and cycleway.

Background
From July 1832 to May 1834, Robert Stephenson was consulting engineer to the industrial Stanhope and Tyne Railway (S&TR), built to transport limestone from Stanhope to Consett, and then with coal onwards to Tyne Dock in South Shields. The company hence authorised Stephenson to construct two steep rope-worked inclines, one at 1:2.5 and a second at 1:3. On 15 May 1834, the first  section from Stanhope to Annfield opened.

After the S&TR sold its assets in 1842, while the northern section from Annfield became part of the Pontop and South Shields Railway, the now abandoned southern section was bought by the Derwent Iron Company.

As a result, the DIC proposed an extension from Crook to the foot of the Meeting Slacks incline, which later became , to provide a southern shipping route for their lime and iron products. Having obtained an extension of their right of way from the Bishop of Durham, the DIC submitted the planes to the S&DR, who agreed to the extension as long as the DIC leased the entire southern section of the former S&TR to them.

Construction
Having taken over the line, the S&DR proposed to bypass Hown's Gill through construction of a suitable bridge. They commissioned Thomas Bouch to design and supervise the construction of such a structure. Bouch's design was submitted to Stephenson, who recommended the use of inverted arches under the five central piers to reduce ground loading.

The construction tender was won by John Anderson, who started works in 1857, with  created to enable the workers to access the site. Three million white firebricks were used in the structure, with sandstone Ashlar dressings, and iron railings along the platform.

Present

The railway was closed to regular passenger services on 23 May 1955. The line was fully closed in the early 1980s, with the tracks lifted by 1985.

The viaduct is now part of the Sustrans national foot and cycle path network as part of the Sea to Sea Cycle Route, which crosses from Whitehaven/Workington on the west coast to Sunderland/Tynemouth on the east coast.

The viaduct can also be reached from the A692 road between Consett and Castleside using a footpath southward from outside the "Stanefordham Inn" (now called The Dam Inn) to the east of "The Grove" housing estate. The viaduct is about  walk. 

In 2012 anti-suicide fences were fitted to the bridge: there had been one suicide from the bridge every two weeks in the first half of 2011 and five between January and August 2012. Despite this, in August 2017 a woman fell to her death from the "wrong" side of the anti-suicide fence.

References
Biddle, Gordon, Britain's Historic Railway Buildings, Oxford University Press,  (2003)
Biddle, Gordon & Nock, O.S., The Railway Heritage of Britain : 150 years of railway architecture and engineering, Studio Editions,  (1990)
Biddle, Gordon and Simmons, J., The Oxford Companion to British Railway History, Oxford,  (1997)
Bonavia, Michael, Historic Railway Sites in Britain, Hale,  (1987)
Civil Engineering Heritage. Northern England
Conolly, W. Philip, British Railways Pre-Grouping Atlas And Gazetteer, Ian Allan Publishing,  (1958/97)
Jowett, Alan, Jowett's Railway Atlas of Great Britain and Ireland, Patrick Stephens Ltd. . (March 1989)
Morgan, Bryan, Railways: Civil Engineering, Arrow,  (1973)
Morgan, Bryan, Railway Relics, Ian Allan,  (1969)
Simmons, J., The Railways of Britain, Macmillan,  (1961–86)
Simmons, J., The Victorian Railway, Thames & Hudson,  (1991)
Smith, Martin, British Railway Bridges and Viaducts, Ian Allan,  (1994)
Tominson, W.W., The North Eastern Railway, David & Charles,  (1987)

Thomas Bouch
Railway viaducts in County Durham
Bridges completed in 1858
Grade II* listed railway bridges and viaducts